This is a list of kings of Bithynia, an ancient kingdom in northwestern Anatolia.

Before Zipoetes I of Bithynia assumed the Greek title of Basileus ("king") in 297 BCE, the positions of him and his predecessors are variously described as "prince", "chieftain", "ruler", and "king". One of the primary sources for the monarchs of Bithynia is About Hericlea of Memnon of Heraclea.

List 
 Doedalsus. Memnon of Heraclea wrote about him: "[Astacus] achieved great glory and strength, when Dudalsos had the dominion of the Bithynians.". Andrew Smith (2004) translated this as "when Doedalsus was the ruler of the Bithynians." The only other mention of this person is found in Strabo's Geographica 12.4.2, where his name is spelt as ̇Δοιδαλσοῦ, but he is not identified with the Bithynians, only with the city of Astacus. Slavova (2015) called him a "Bithynian king". According to Olmstead (2022), he was "the first-known semi-independent king of Bithynia".
 Boteiras d.  376 BCE. He is mentioned only by Memnon as a successor of Dudalsos.
 Bas  376–326 BCE. Memnon wrote: "The life of this [Bas] became 71 years, of which he reigned as king 50." (. Smith (2004) translated this passage as: "He lived for 71 years, and was king for 50 years."
 Zipoetes I  326–278 BCE. Memnon of Heraclea called him "Zipoites the eparch of the Bithynians". Andrew Smith (2004) translated this as "Zipoetes, the ruler of the Bithynians". According to Williams (1990), Zipoetes was a "chieftain" before he assumed the Greek title of basileus ("king") in 297 BCE. Memnon of Heraclea appeared not to make such a distinction when he described Zipoetes' entire reign: "The life of this one [Zipoites] was 76 years, and he ruled the dominion 48.". Smith (2004) translated the passage as "Zipoetes lived for 76 years and ruled the kingdom for 48 years." Slavova (2015) called him a "Bithynian king".
 Zipoetes II 278–276 BC
 Nicomedes I 278–255 BC. Memnon described him as "...the Bithynians, whose basileus Nicomedes..." and "the basileus of Bithynia Nicomedes"; Smith (2004) rendered basileus as "king".
 Etazeta (regent) 255–254 BC
 Ziaelas 254–228 BC
 Prusias I Cholus 228–182 BC
 Prusias II Cynegus 182–149 BC
 Nicomedes II Epiphanes 149–127 BC
 Nicomedes III Euergetes 127–94 BC
 Nicomedes IV Philopator 94–74 BC
 Socrates Chrestus who ruled briefly in about 90 BC

The coinage of these kings show their regal portraits, which tend to be engraved in an extremely accomplished Hellenistic style.

Family tree of kings of Bithynia

See also
Bithynian coinage

Notes

References

Bibliography 
 
 
 

Bithynia
Thracian kings
Bithynia